Nick William Sheridan (born May 21, 1988) is an American football coach and former quarterback who is currently the TE coach for the Washington Huskies. He previously served as the offensive coordinator at Indiana University. He played college football at the University of Michigan.

Playing career  
Sheridan walked on to the Michigan Wolverines football team as a quarterback in 2006. He earned a scholarship his junior year and started 4 games in 2008. Sheridan graduated from Michigan in 2010 with a degree in political science.

Coaching career  
After graduating from Michigan, Sheridan took a coaching position at his alma mater, Saline High School. He coached quarterbacks at Saline for one year before leaving to join Willie Taggart's coaching staff at Western Kentucky as a graduate assistant in 2011. He was promoted to passing coordinator and quarterbacks coach in 2012. He served in that same capacity at South Florida in 2013 after Taggart was named the head coach there. He was fired after one season at South Florida along with South Florida offensive coordinator Walt Wells. He was hired to be a graduate assistant at Tennessee in 2014 following his termination from South Florida. He coached at Tennessee for four seasons before being named the quarterbacks coach at Indiana in 2017. He switched to the tight ends coach in 2019 after offensive coordinator and tight ends coach Mike DeBord retired and Fresno State offensive coordinator Kalen DeBoer was named the offensive coordinator and quarterbacks coach. He was named the offensive coordinator and quarterbacks coach for the 2020 season after DeBoer departed to be the head coach at Fresno State. 

Sheridan was terminated by Indiana on November 28, 2021.

Sheridan was hired by the Washington Huskies on December 14, 2021, as their new tight ends coach.

Personal life  
Sheridan is the son of Bill Sheridan, a longtime football coach who was the defensive coordinator of the Tampa Bay Buccaneers and is currently the linebackers coach for the Arlington Renegades. Sheridan and his wife Sarah have one son.

References

External links 
 Indiana profile
 Tennessee profile
 Michigan profile

1988 births
Living people
American football quarterbacks
Indiana Hoosiers football coaches
Michigan Wolverines football players
South Florida Bulls football coaches
Tennessee Volunteers football coaches
Western Kentucky Hilltoppers football coaches
High school football coaches in Michigan
People from Saline, Michigan
Coaches of American football from Michigan
Players of American football from Michigan